Clinical and Translational Science Award (CTSA) is a type of U.S. federal grant administered by the National Center for Advancing Translational Sciences, part of the National Institutes of Health. The CTSA program began in October 2006 under the auspices of the National Center for Research Resources with a consortium of 12 academic health centers. The program was fully implemented in 2012, comprising 60 grantee institutions and their partners.

Program overview 
The CTSA program helps institutions create an integrated academic home for clinical and translational science with the resources to support researchers and research teams working to apply new knowledge and techniques to patient care. The program is structured to encourage collaborations among researchers from different scientific fields.

The CTSA program has raised awareness of clinical and translational science as a discipline among academic and industry researchers, philanthropists, government officials and the broader public.

Strategic goals 
CTSA consortium leaders have set five broad goals to guide their activities. These include building national clinical and translational research capability, providing training and improving career development of clinical and translational scientists, enhancing consortium-wide collaborations, improving the health of U.S. communities and the nation, and advancing T1 translational research to move basic laboratory discoveries and knowledge into clinical testing.

Selected research areas 
Institutions funded by the CTSA program are working with other research facilities to improve drug discovery and development. For example, several consortium institutions are collaborating with the Rat Resource and Research Center at the University of Missouri to increase the speed of drug screening so that drug research is translated into clinical uses more quickly.
Consortium institutions also are creating new fields of study or new uses for technologies. For example, researchers at the University of Rochester are pioneering the field of lipidomics, exploring how lipids affect human disease. Their work has led to lipid research collaborations among experts in community and preventive medicine, proteomics, nutrition, and pharmaceutical research.

Some CTSA institutions are collaborating with community-based organizations to ensure research is translated successfully into clinical practice. Researchers at Duke University are working to prevent strokes by partnering with a local health care program to build stroke awareness among Latino immigrants.

Others are pursuing public and private partnerships to speed innovation. For example, the Oregon Health and Science University and Intel are developing new wireless devices with sensors to detect symptoms in patients who have diabetes or those at high risk of stroke so they can be treated earlier.

Participating institutions 
With the most recent awards, announced in July 2011, the consortium comprises 60 institutions in 30 states and the District of Columbia. These include:

 Albert Einstein College of Medicine (partnering with Montefiore Medical Center)
 Boston University
 Case Western Reserve University
 Columbia University
 Children's National Medical Center
 Emory University (partnering with Morehouse School of Medicine, Georgia Institute of Technology, and University of Georgia)
 Duke University
 Georgetown University with Howard University
 Harvard University
 Indiana University School of Medicine (partnering with Purdue University and University of Notre Dame)
 Johns Hopkins University
 Mayo Clinic
 Medical College of Wisconsin
 Medical University of South Carolina
 Mount Sinai School of Medicine
 New York University School of Medicine
 Northwestern University
 Ohio State University
 Oregon Health & Science University
 Penn State Milton S. Hershey Medical Center
 Rockefeller University
 Rutgers University
 Scripps Research Institute
 Stanford University
 Tufts University
 University of Alabama at Birmingham
 University of Arkansas for Medical Sciences
 University of California, Davis
 University of California, Irvine
 University of California Los Angeles
 University of California, San Diego
 University of California, San Francisco
 University of Chicago
 University of Cincinnati
 University of Colorado Denver
 University of Florida
 University of Kansas Medical Center
 University of Kentucky Research Foundations
 University of Massachusetts, Worcester
 University of Michigan
 University of New Mexico Health Sciences
 University of Minnesota
 University of North Carolina at Chapel Hill
 University of Illinois at Chicago
 University of Iowa
 University of Pennsylvania
 University of Pittsburgh
 University of Rochester School of Medicine and Dentistry
 University of Southern California
 University of Texas Health Science Center at Houston
 University of Texas Health Science Center at San Antonio
 University of Texas Medical Branch
 University of Texas Southwestern Medical Center at Dallas
 University of Utah
 University of Washington
 University of Wisconsin - Madison
 Vanderbilt University - CTSA Coordinating Center (partnering with Meharry Medical College)
 Virginia Commonwealth University
 Washington University in St. Louis
 Weill Cornell Medical College (partnering with Hunter College)
 Yale University

Investigations by the Department of Health and Human Services Office of Inspector General (OIG)

On the 20 December 2011, the OIG published a report critical of the NIH's administration of the Clinical and Translational Science Awards (CTSA) program. The report read in part:

See also

 List of medicine awards

References

External links 
 Clinical and Translational Science Awards: Advancing Scientific Discoveries Nationwide to Improve Health
 CTSA consortium
 National Center for Advancing Translational Sciences

Research
Medicine awards
National Institutes of Health